Sir Horace Owen Compton Beasley OBE (2 July 1877 – 1 January 1960) was the Chief Justice of the Madras High Court from 1929 to 1937.

Biography
The son of Ammon Beasley, general manager of the Taff Vale Railway Company, Owen Beasley was born at Chiswick, and educated at Westminster and Jesus College, Cambridge (B.A. 1899). He was called to the Bar from the Inner Temple in 1902, and worked on the South Western Circuit. 

He was a puisne judge of the High Court of Burma from 1923 to 1924, then at Madras from 1924 to 1929; he was appointed Chief Justice of the Madras High Court in 1929, serving in that capacity until 1937. 

It was said of him that "the Madras bar never lost faith in his sense of justice and honesty of purpose..." and that he had an "uncompromising sense of duty and utter disregard for personal distinction between lawyers", observing also his "imperial attitude of benevolent despotism".

Beasley served in World War I, first as a 2nd Lieutenant in the Royal Welch Fusiliers, then as a Captain in the Cameronians (Scottish Rifles), and as a Major in the Labour Corps. He was appointed OBE in 1919, and knighted in 1930. He was married with children, and lived at Bullingham Mansions, Pitt Street, London.

References

1877 births
1960 deaths
Knights Bachelor
Judges of the Madras High Court
Chief Justices of the Madras High Court
Members of the Inner Temple
British India judges
English barristers
English cricketers
Glamorgan cricketers
British Army personnel of World War I
Royal Welch Fusiliers officers
Cameronians officers
Royal Pioneer Corps officers
Officers of the Order of the British Empire